Boban Alummoodan is an Indian actor who appears in Malayalam films and Television serials. He is the son of the late Malayalam actor Alummoodan. He is best known for his role as Prakash Mathew in the 1999 movie Niram. Boban played a lead role in the horror movie Indriyam. He is also noted for his role in the movie Kalyanaraman.

Filmography

Television serials (partial)

References

External links
 

Year of birth missing (living people)
Living people
Indian male film actors
Indian male television actors
Male actors in Malayalam cinema
Male actors in Malayalam television
21st-century Indian male actors
Vazhappally